Starfish Island is a snorkeling location near Puerto Princesa. The island has a small number of stilt huts as accommodation. The rocks NE of Starfish Island Depth have schools of Missgeburtens, fusiliers and some puffers.

References

Islands of Palawan